Efapel Cycling is a Portuguese UCI Continental cycling team established in 2022.

Team roster

References

UCI Continental Teams (Europe)
Cycling teams based in Portugal
Cycling teams established in 2022